The 2013–14 Brooklyn Nets season was 47th season of the franchise, its 38th in the National Basketball Association (NBA), and its second season playing in the New York City borough of Brooklyn.

After making the playoffs for the first time in six years during the 2012–13 season, the Nets had a busy off-season which featured the hiring of Jason Kidd (who played for the then-New Jersey Nets from 2001 to 2008 and led the Nets to back-to-back NBA Finals in 2002 and 2003) as the head coach. The Nets also traded Gerald Wallace, Kris Humphries, and three future draft picks to the Celtics for all-stars Kevin Garnett and Paul Pierce, along with Jason Terry. These transactions led to the Nets having the largest payroll in the NBA, and high expectations heading into the season. The Nets would go on to upset the Toronto Raptors in seven games in the first round of the playoffs. However, in the Semifinals, the Nets would go on to lose to the two-time defending NBA champion and eventual Eastern Conference champion Miami Heat in five games despite sweeping the Heat, 4 games to 0, in the regular season.

Following the season, Pierce signed with the Washington Wizards.

Preseason

Draft picks

Regular season

October–November

The Nets' season began on October 30 with a 94–98 loss to the Cleveland Cavaliers. In their home opener at the Barclays Center, the Nets defeated the Miami Heat, 101–100, on November 1. On November 3, the Nets lost to the Orlando Magic, being downed 1–2 in the regular season. The Nets had defeated the Utah Jazz in a blowout on November 5. In the first game of back-to-backs on November 8, the Nets lost to the Washington Wizards in overtime, 108–112. On November 9, the Nets lost the second game of the back-to-back to the Indiana Pacers, 91–96. The Sacramento Kings defeated the Nets in a blowout on November 13, losing three straight games.

On November 15, the Nets defeated the Phoenix Suns 100–98 in overtime. The Nets lost on November 16 to the Los Angeles Clippers, 103–110. In their game against the Clippers, the Nets were without four of their starters, due to injuries. The Nets lost against the Portland Trail Blazers on November 18. On November 20, the Nets were defeated 91–95 by the Charlotte Bobcats. On November 22, the Nets lost four straight following a loss to the Minnesota Timberwolves. After losing to the Detroit Pistons, their losing streak stretched to five on November 24.

On November 26, the Nets defeated the Toronto Raptors, 102–100, to end their losing streak. However, the Nets lost to the Los Angeles Lakers on November 27. On November 29, the Nets lost against the Houston Rockets. At the end of the month, the Nets defeated the Memphis Grizzlies with a 5–12 record.

December

The Nets would begin the month of December with a blowout loss to the Denver Nuggets. On December 5, the Nets would continue their losing ways in another blowout loss against the New York Knicks. On December 7, the Nets would defeat the Milwaukee Bucks. Then, the Nets would defeat the Boston Celtics on December 10. The Nets would extend their winning streak to three following a win against the Clippers on December 12. Their brief winning streak would come to an end on December 13 against the Pistons.

On December 16, the Nets easily defeated the Philadelphia 76ers in a 36-point blowout. In that game, Joe Johnson, managed to shoot eight three-point field goals in the third quarter to tie an official NBA record. The Nets would lose against the Wizards on December 18. Two days later, the Nets would lose to the 76ers in overtime, 120–121. The 76ers would win the game with a buzzer beater by Evan Turner. On December 21, Brook Lopez was sidelined with a fractured right foot that ended his season.

On December 23, the Nets would lose their third straight game to the Pacers. Then, the Nets would lose again on Christmas, this time to the Chicago Bulls, stretching their losing streak to four. On December 27, the Nets would finally win by defeating the Bucks. Following the win, the Nets would lose against the Pacers on December 28. To end the calendar year, the Nets would lose against the San Antonio Spurs for the second December 31 in a row. Heading into 2014, the Nets were 10–21.

January
At the turn of the calendar, the Nets' misfortunes had been lifted on January 2 when Joe Johnson shot a buzzer beater against the Oklahoma City Thunder to win the game 95–93. The Nets would defeat the Cavaliers, 89–82, on January 4. To win their third straight game, the Nets defeated the Atlanta Hawks. On January 8, the Nets then ended the Golden State Warriors' 10-game winning streak, becoming 4–0 in 2014. Then, on January 10, the Nets' winning streak extended to 5 games after a victory against the Heat in double overtime.

The Nets would suffer their first defeat in 2014 to the Raptors on January 11. On January 16, the Nets would defeat the Hawks in The O2 Arena in London. The Nets would head to Madison Square Garden and blowout their cross-city rival, the Knicks, on January 20. On January 21, the Nets would defeat the Magic, winning their third straight game. The Nets would then defeat the Dallas Mavericks by one point, and going 9–1 in 2014. On January 26, Paul Pierce and Kevin Garnett would go back to Boston and win their fifth straight game.

The Nets would suffer their second loss of the year on January 27 to the Raptors, losing by one point (103–104). As the month was coming to a close, the Nets would be handed a third loss by the Thunder on January 31. At the end of the month, the Nets' record would be 20–24.

February
In their first game of the month, the Nets would lose by one point (96–97) to the Pacers on February 1. On February 3, the Nets defeated the 76ers, 108–102. On the same day, Kidd would be named the Coach of the Month for January, when he coached the team to have a 10–3 record in that month. Playing an injury-plagued Spurs on February 6, the Nets defeated San Antonio. On February 7, the Nets were defeated by the Pistons. With the Nets' rookie, Mason Plumlee, leading the team for the night, Brooklyn defeated the New Orleans Pelicans on February 9.

On February 12, the Nets defeated the Bobcats behind Pierce's 25 points. The Nets were defeated by 16 points against the Bulls on February 13. Representing the Nets, Johnson had scored 5 points, 1 rebound, and 1 assist at the 2014 NBA All-Star Game. Playing the Jazz in the EnergySolutions Arena, the Nets defeated Utah on February 19, 105–99. On February 22, the Nets lost to the Warriors.

The Nets won against the Lakers on February 23, 108–102. In that game, Jason Collins made his debut as the first publicly gay athlete to play in any of four major North American pro sports leagues. On February 26, the Nets were defeated in a 44-point blowout against the Trail Blazers. To respond to their humiliating loss, the Nets defeated the Nuggets by 23 points. The Nets would end the month of February being two games under .500, 27–29.

March

To start off the month of March, the Nets defeated the Bucks behind Marcus Thornton's 25 points. The Nets were at the .500 mark (29–29) for the first time since November 5 with a victory against the Bulls on March 3. Two days later, the Nets were above .500 for the first time (30–29) of the season after defeating the Grizzlies and winning their third straight game.

On March 7, the Nets were defeated by the Celtics, ending their 3-game winning streak. The Nets would bounce back to win in a back-to-back against Sacramento and Toronto from March 9–10. To win three straight games once more, the Nets defeated the Heat on March 12, 96–95, due to a bad inbound pass by Chris Bosh. The Nets' winning streak would end against the Wizards on March 15.

On March 17, the Nets defeated the Suns behind Williams' 28 points. To win their tenth straight home game, the Nets defeated the Bobcats on March 19, 104–99. On March 21, the Nets would defeat the Celtics in a blowout. On March 23, the Nets completed a season sweep of the Mavericks for the first time since the 1999–2000 season, by defeating them 107–104 in overtime.

In overtime, the Nets would be defeated by the Pelicans on March 24, 104–109. Playing in their third straight overtime game, the Nets would lose 111–116, to the Bobcats on March 26. On March 28, the Nets defeated the Cavaliers. The Nets would end the month defeating the Timberwolves and tying a franchise-record 13-straight home games on March 30. With the month over, the Nets' record would be at 39–33.

April

The Nets would end their 14-game losing streak versus the Rockets on April 1, extend their home game winning streak to 14, and clinch a playoff berth in the process. On the same day, Kidd was named the Coach of the Month for March, when he coached the team to have a 12–4 record in that month. The Nets would be defeated in a 29-point blowout against the Knicks on April 2. On April 4, the Nets won a franchise record of 15-consecutive home games following a 116–104 win over the Pistons. Brooklyn had defeated the 76ers on April 5, 105–101. The Nets completed a 4-game season sweep against the Heat on April 8, which would be the first time that a team would sweep the Heat during the Miami Big 3 (Chris Bosh, LeBron James, and Dwyane Wade) era.

The Nets would lose 111–115 to the Magic on April 9. On April 11, the Nets were defeated by the Hawks, 88–93. To avenge their earlier loss, the Nets defeated the Magic on April 13. The Nets lost by 11 points to the Knicks on April 15. On April 16, the  Nets' regular season ended with an 85–114 loss to the Cavaliers. Following the loss, the Nets finished with a 44–38 record, being the sixth seed in the 2014 NBA Playoffs. It was widely suspected that Brooklyn's late season losses correlated with a preference for facing Toronto in the first round.

Standings

Playoffs

First round

For the Nets, the 2014 NBA Playoffs began against division-rival Toronto Raptors. The series began on April 19, with the Nets winning Game 1, 94–87. The Raptors responded to the loss with a 100–95 win in Game 2 to even the series 1–1. To take the series lead once more, the Nets came up with a 102–98 victory in Game 3. In Game 4, the Raptors evened the series 2–2, as the Nets lost 79–87. The Nets trailed the series for the first time after a Game 5 loss, despite outscoring the Raptors by 20 points in the fourth quarter. After their disappointing loss in Game 5, the Nets fought for their season as they blew-out the Raptors in Game 6 with a 97–83 victory. The Nets moved on to the Conference Semifinals with a late game block by Paul Pierce against Raptors' guard Kyle Lowry for a 104–103 victory in the final Game 7.

Conference semifinals

Going on to the Conference Semifinals, the Nets were going to meet the Miami Heat, the very team that they had swept in the regular season. In Game 1, the Nets had lost in a 21-point blowout. The Nets would lose Game 2, 82–94. Knowing they would go 0–3 in the series if they lose, the Nets relied on the three-point field goal to defeat the Heat. In Game 4, the Nets fell 1–3 in the series by losing by six points in a game where LeBron James scored a then playoff career-high 49 points. With the opportunity to take Game 5 to overtime, when the Nets were trailing the series 1–3, Joe Johnson had failed to attempt a game-tying shot, losing 96–94, and ending their 2013–14 season.

Game log

Summer League

|- style="background:#fcc;"
| 1
| July 7
| Detroit
| 
| Tyshawn Taylor (17)
| Mason Plumlee (14)
| Chris Wright (5)
| Amway CenterN/A
| 0–1
|- style="background:#fcc;"
| 2
| July 8
| @ Miami
| 
| Tyshawn Taylor (25)
| Mason Plumlee (9)
| Lighty & Shengelia (4)
| Amway CenterN/A
| 0–2
|- style="background:#fcc;"
| 3
| July 10
| Utah
| 
| Chris Wright (20)
| James & Shengelia (5)
| Damion James (4)
| Amway CenterN/A
| 0–3
|- style="background:#fcc;"
| 4
| July 11
| Houston
| 
| Three players (15)
| Keith Benson (6)
| Tyshawn Taylor (7)
| Amway CenterN/A
| 0–4
|- style="background:#fcc;"
| 5
| July 12
| @ Philadelphia
| 
| Plumlee & Wright (23)
| Keith Benson (16)
| Chris Wright (7)
| Amway CenterN/A
| 0–5

Preseason

|- style="background:#cfc;"
| 1
| October 8
| @ Washington
| 
| Tyshawn Taylor (16)
| Evans & Garnett (7)
| Tyshawn Taylor (6)
| Verizon Center9,743
| 1–0
|- style="background:#fcc;"
| 2
| October 12
| Detroit
| 
| Andray Blatche (15)
| Reggie Evans (5)
| Shaun Livingston (7)
| Barclays Center16,331
| 1–1
|- style="background:#cfc;"
| 3
| October 14
| @ Philadelphia
| 
| Johnson & Teletović (21)
| Reggie Evans (10)
| Shaun Livingston (8)
| Wells Fargo Center6,315
| 2–1
|- style="background:#cfc;"
| 4
| October 15
| Boston
| 
| Brook Lopez (20)
| Paul Pierce (10)
| Paul Pierce (5)
| Barclays Center15,554
| 3–1
|- style="background:#cfc;"
| 5
| October 17
| Miami
| 
| Brook Lopez (14)
| Reggie Evans (9)
| Paul Pierce (7)
| Barclays Center17,732
| 4–1
|- style="background:#fcc;"
| 6
| October 23
| @ Boston
| 
| Tyshawn Taylor (15)
| Mason Plumlee (9)
| Shaun Livingston (5)
| TD Garden15,865
| 4–2
|- style="background:#cfc;"
| 7
| October 25
| @ Miami
| 
| Alan Anderson (17)
| Mason Plumlee (10)
| Joe Johnson (4)
| American Airlines Arena19,600
| 5–2

Regular season

|- style="background:#fcc;"
| 1
| October 30
| @ Cleveland
| 
| Brook Lopez (21)
| Kevin Garnett (10)
| Deron Williams (9)
| Quicken Loans Arena20,562
| 0–1

|- style="background:#cfc;"
| 2
| November 1
| Miami
| 
| Johnson & Pierce (19)
| Kevin Garnett (7)
| Deron Williams (8)
| Barclays Center17,732
| 1–1
|- style="background:#fcc;"
| 3
| November 3
| @ Orlando
| 
| Brook Lopez (21)
| Paul Pierce (7)
| Livingston & Williams (7)
| Amway Center15,297
| 1–2
|- style="background:#cfc;"
| 4
| November 5
| Utah
| 
| Brook Lopez (27)
| Brook Lopez (7)
| Deron Williams (8)
| Barclays Center17,732
| 2–2
|- style="background:#fcc;"
| 5
| November 8
| @ Washington
| 
| Brook Lopez (23)
| Andray Blatche (13)
| Joe Johnson (4)
| Verizon Center17,215
| 2–3
|- style="background:#fcc;"
| 6
| November 9
| Indiana
| 
| Johnson & Williams (17)
| Garnett & Pierce (8)
| Deron Williams (10)
| Barclays Center17,732
| 2–4
|- style="background:#fcc;"
| 7
| November 13
| @ Sacramento
| 
| Brook Lopez (16)
| Lopez & Pierce (9)
| Deron Williams (7)
| Sleep Train Arena15,122
| 2–5
|- style="background:#cfc;"
| 8
| November 15
| @ Phoenix
| 
| Brook Lopez (27)
| Kevin Garnett (14)
| Shaun Livingston (6)
| US Airways Center15,984
| 3–5
|- style="background:#fcc;"
| 9
| November 16
| @ L.A. Clippers
| 
| Blatche & Plumlee (19)
| Reggie Evans (11)
| Joe Johnson (6)
| Staples Center19,349
| 3–6
|- style="background:#fcc;"
| 10
| November 18
| Portland
| 
| Shaun Livingston (23)
| Reggie Evans (9)
| Joe Johnson (3)
| Barclays Center17,732
| 3–7
|- style="background:#fcc;"
| 11
| November 20
| @ Charlotte
| 
| Andray Blatche (25)
| Kevin Garnett (8)
| Shaun Livingston (5)
| Time Warner Cable Arena13,843
| 3–8
|- style="background:#fcc;"
| 12
| November 22
| @ Minnesota
| 
| Andray Blatche (16)
| Kevin Garnett (8)
| Joe Johnson (4)
| Target Center15,551
| 3–9
|- style="background:#fcc;"
| 13
| November 24
| Detroit
| 
| Joe Johnson (34)
| Kevin Garnett (9)
| Shaun Livingston (7)
| Barclays Center17,732
| 3–10
|- style="background:#cfc;"
| 14
| November 26
| @ Toronto
| 
| Andray Blatche (24)
| Kevin Garnett (6)
| Shaun Livingston (7)
| Air Canada Centre16,421
| 4–10
|- style="background:#fcc;"
| 15
| November 27
| L.A. Lakers
| 
| Joe Johnson (18)
| Kevin Garnett (9)
| Paul Pierce (5)
| Barclays Center 17,732
| 4–11
|- style="background:#fcc;"
| 16
| November 29
| @ Houston
| 
| Mirza Teletović (18)
| Mirza Teletović (13)
| Tyshawn Taylor (12)
| Toyota Center18,138
| 4–12
|- style="background:#cfc;"
| 17
| November 30
| @ Memphis
| 
| Joe Johnson (26)
| Brook Lopez (9)
| Joe Johnson (6)
| FedExForum17,012
| 5–12

|- style="background:#fcc;"
| 18
| December 3
| Denver
| 
| Joe Johnson (22)
| Kevin Garnett (6)
| Shaun Livingston (4)
| Barclays Center17,732
| 5–13
|- style="background:#fcc;"
| 19
| December 5
| New York
| 
| Brook Lopez (24)
| Brook Lopez (9)
| Andray Blatche (3)
| Barclays Center17,732
| 5–14
|- style="background:#cfc;"
| 20
| December 7
| @ Milwaukee
| 
| Brook Lopez (32)
| Kevin Garnett (8)
| Joe Johnson (5)
| BMO Harris Bradley Center14,963
| 6–14
|- style="background:#cfc;"
| 21
| December 10
| Boston
| 
| Deron Williams (25)
| Kevin Garnett (9)
| Deron Williams (7)
| Barclays Center15,738
| 7–14
|- style="background:#cfc;"
| 22
| December 12
| L.A. Clippers
| 
| Joe Johnson (21)
| Andray Blatche (9)
| Paul Pierce (5)
| Barclays Center15,563
| 8–14
|- style="background:#fcc;"
| 23
| December 13
| @ Detroit
| 
| Deron Williams (22)
| Andray Blatche (12)
| Deron Williams (9)
| Palace of Auburn Hills15,159
| 8–15
|- style="background:#cfc;"
| 24
| December 16
| Philadelphia
| 
| Joe Johnson (37)
| Mason Plumlee (8)
| Deron Williams (13)
| Barclays Center16,733
| 9–15
|- style="background:#fcc;"
| 25
| December 18
| Washington
| 
| Paul Pierce (27)
| Joe Johnson (7)
| Deron Williams (13)
| Barclays Center16,187
| 9–16
|- style="background:#fcc;"
| 26
| December 20
| @ Philadelphia
| 
| Alan Anderson (26)
| Paul Pierce (10)
| Deron Williams (14)
| Wells Fargo Center15,267
| 9–17
|- style="background:#fcc;"
| 27
| December 23
| Indiana
| 
| Joe Johnson (17)
| Andray Blatche (7)
| Deron Williams (8)
| Barclays Center17,732
| 9–18
|- style="background:#fcc;"
| 28
| December 25
| Chicago
| 
| Deron Williams (18)
| Reggie Evans (13)
| Deron Williams (4)
| Barclays Center17,732
| 9–19
|- style="background:#cfc;"
| 29
| December 27
| Milwaukee
| 
| Shaun Livingston (20)
| Reggie Evans (13)
| Shaun Livingston (6)
| Barclays Center17,732
| 10–19
|- style="background:#fcc;"
| 30
| December 28
| @ Indiana
| 
| Paul Pierce (18)
| Kevin Garnett (7)
| Deron Williams (6)
| Bankers Life Fieldhouse18,165
| 10–20
|- style="background:#fcc;"
| 31
| December 31
| @ San Antonio
| 
| Livingston & Plumlee (15)
| Mason Plumlee (13)
| Deron Williams (6)
| AT&T Center17,409
| 10–21

|- style="background:#cfc;"
| 32
| January 2
| @ Oklahoma City
| 
| Deron Williams (29)
| Kevin Garnett (7)
| Livingston & Williams (4)
| Chesapeake Energy Arena18,203
| 11–21
|- style="background:#cfc;"
| 33
| January 4
| Cleveland
| 
| Deron Williams (21)
| Reggie Evans (11)
| Deron Williams (6)
| Barclays Center17,732
| 12–21
|- style="background:#cfc;"
| 34
| January 6
| Atlanta
| 
| Joe Johnson (23)
| Kevin Garnett (10)
| Johnson & Kirilenko (4)
| Barclays Center15,326
| 13–21
|- style="background:#cfc;"
| 35
| January 8
| Golden State
| 
| Joe Johnson (27)
| Mirza Teletović (10)
| Andray Blatche (3)
| Barclays Center17,732
| 14–21
|- style="background:#cfc;"
| 36
| January 10
| Miami
| 
| Joe Johnson (32)
| Shaun Livingston (11)
| Johnson & Livingston (5)
| Barclays Center17,732
| 15–21
|- style="background:#fcc;"
| 37
| January 11
| @ Toronto
| 
| Paul Pierce (15)
| Joe Johnson (6)
| Joe Johnson (6)
| Air Canada Centre19,800
| 15–22
|- style="background:#cfc;"
| 38
| January 16
| @ Atlanta
| 
| Joe Johnson (29)
| Andray Blatche (14)
| Jason Terry (7)
| The O2 Arena18,689
| 16–22
|- style="background:#cfc;"
| 39
| January 20
| @ New York
| 
| Joe Johnson (25)
| Andray Blatche (12)
| Johnson & Pierce (5)
| Madison Square Garden19,812
| 17–22
|- style="background:#cfc;"
| 40
| January 21
| Orlando
| 
| Andray Blatche (18)
| Paul Pierce (6)
| Deron Williams (9)
| Barclays Center15,482
| 18–22
|- style="background:#cfc;"
| 41
| January 24
| Dallas
| 
| Mirza Teletović (34)
| Kevin Garnett (11)
| Deron Williams (11)
| Barclays Center16,110
| 19–22
|- style="background:#cfc;"
| 42
| January 26
| @ Boston
| 
| Andray Blatche (17)
| Shaun Livingston (8)
| Deron Williams (7)
| TD Garden18,624
| 20–22
|- style="background:#fcc;"
| 43
| January 27
| Toronto
| 
| Paul Pierce (33)
| Kevin Garnett (11)
| Deron Williams (11)
| Barclays Center15,790
| 20–23
|- style="background:#fcc;"
| 44
| January 31
| Oklahoma City
| 
| Shaun Livingston (16)
| Paul Pierce (5)
| Mirza Teletović (4)
| Barclays Center17,732
| 20–24

|- style="background:#fcc;"
| 45
| February 1
| @ Indiana
| 
| Shaun Livingston (24)
| Kevin Garnett (10)
| Deron Williams (6)
| Bankers Life Fieldhouse18,165
| 20–25
|- style="background:#cfc;"
| 46
| February 3
| Philadelphia
| 
| Paul Pierce (25)
| Kevin Garnett (7)
| Shaun Livingston (8)
| Barclays Center16,727
| 21–25
|- style="background:#cfc;"
| 47
| February 6
| San Antonio
| 
| Alan Anderson (22)
| Kevin Garnett (9)
| Deron Williams (8)
| Barclays Center17,732
| 22–25
|- style="background:#fcc;"
| 48
| February 7
| @ Detroit
| 
| Jason Terry (18)
| Reggie Evans (9)
| Marquis Teague (4)
| Palace of Auburn Hills13,727
| 22–26
|- style="background:#cfc;"
| 49
| February 9
| New Orleans
| 
| Mason Plumlee (22)
| Mason Plumlee (13)
| Deron Williams (6)
| Barclays Center17,732
| 23–26
|- style="background:#cfc;"
| 50
| February 12
| Charlotte
| 
| Paul Pierce (25)
| Mirza Teletović (8)
| Deron Williams (7)
| Barclays Center16,862
| 24–26
|- style="background:#fcc;"
| 51
| February 13
| @ Chicago
| 
| Paul Pierce (15)
| Kevin Garnett (7)
| Deron Williams (5)
| United Center21,500
| 24–27
|- align="center"
|colspan="9" bgcolor="#bbcaff"|All-Star Break
|- style="background:#cfc;"
| 52
| February 19
| @ Utah
| 
| Joe Johnson (27)
| Blatche & Pierce (6)
| Livingston & Williams (7)
| EnergySolutions Arena17,386
| 25–27
|- style="background:#fcc;"
| 53
| February 22
| @ Golden State
| 
| Deron Williams (20)
| Andrei Kirilenko (9)
| Deron Williams (6)
| Oracle Arena19,596
| 25–28
|- style="background:#cfc;"
| 54
| February 23
| @ L.A. Lakers
| 
| Deron Williams (30)
| Andrei Kirilenko (10)
| Joe Johnson (8)
| Staples Center18,997
| 26–28
|- style="background:#fcc;"
| 55
| February 26
| @ Portland
| 
| Deron Williams (12)
| Kevin Garnett (7)
| Anderson & Williams (3)
| Moda Center20,015
| 26–29
|- style="background:#cfc;"
| 56
| February 27
| @ Denver
| 
| Paul Pierce (18)
| Andray Blatche (9)
| Shaun Livingston (8)
| Pepsi Center14,826
| 27–29

|- style="background:#cfc;"
| 57
| March 1
| @ Milwaukee
| 
| Marcus Thornton (25)
| Andray Blatche (13)
| Kirilenko & Pierce (5)
| BMO Harris Bradley Center14,081
| 28–29
|- style="background:#cfc;"
| 58
| March 3
| Chicago
| 
| Deron Williams (20)
| Paul Pierce (7)
| Deron Williams (6)
| Barclays Center17,732
| 29–29
|- style="background:#cfc;"
| 59
| March 5
| Memphis
| 
| Joe Johnson (21)
| Paul Pierce (8)
| Deron Williams (7)
| Barclays Center17,053
| 30–29
|- style="background:#fcc;"
| 60
| March 7
| @ Boston
| 
| Joe Johnson (21)
| Joe Johnson (7)
| Deron Williams (4)
| TD Garden18,195
| 30–30
|- style="background:#cfc;"
| 61
| March 9
| Sacramento
| 
| Marcus Thornton (27)
| Deron Williams (4)
| Deron Williams (7)
| Barclays Center17,732
| 31–30
|- style="background:#cfc;"
| 62
| March 10
| Toronto
| 
| Livingston & Williams (18)
| Mason Plumlee (8)
| Deron Williams (5)
| Barclays Center17,351
| 32–30
|- style="background:#cfc;"
| 63
| March 12
| @ Miami
| 
| Paul Pierce (29)
| Shaun Livingston (7)
| Deron Williams (8)
| American Airlines Arena19,616
| 33–30
|- style="background:#fcc;"
| 64
| March 15
| @ Washington
| 
| Marcus Thornton (19)
| Johnson & Williams (7)
| Deron Williams (7)
| Verizon Center20,356
| 33–31
|- style="background:#cfc;"
| 65
| March 17
| Phoenix
| 
| Deron Williams (28)
| Mason Plumlee (11)
| Johnson & Livingston (5)
| Barclays Center17,401
| 34–31
|- style="background:#cfc;"
| 66
| March 19
| Charlotte
| 
| Deron Williams (25)
| Joe Johnson (8)
| Joe Johnson (8)
| Barclays Center17,222
| 35–31
|- style="background:#cfc;"
| 67
| March 21
| Boston
| 
| Joe Johnson (27)
| Shaun Livingston (7)
| Livingston & Williams (6)
| Barclays Center17,732
| 36–31
|- style="background:#cfc;"
| 68
| March 23
| @ Dallas
| 
| Joe Johnson (22)
| Three players (7)
| Four players (3)
| American Airlines Center19,603
| 37–31
|- style="background:#fcc;"
| 69
| March 24
| @ New Orleans
| 
| Paul Pierce (24)
| Mason Plumlee (11)
| Deron Williams (5)
| Smoothie King Center14,599
| 37–32
|- style="background:#fcc;"
| 70
| March 26
| @ Charlotte
| 
| Deron Williams (29)
| Andray Blatche (7)
| Livingston & Williams (7)
| Time Warner Cable Arena15,943
| 37–33
|- style="background:#cfc;"
| 71
| March 28
| Cleveland
| 
| Paul Pierce (22)
| Mirza Teletović (10)
| Shaun Livingston (6)
| Barclays Center17,732
| 38–33
|- style="background:#cfc;"
| 72
| March 30
| Minnesota
| 
| Paul Pierce (22)
| Mason Plumlee (8)
| Deron Williams (5)
| Barclays Center17,732
| 39–33

|- style="background:#cfc;"
| 73
| April 1
| Houston
| 
| Joe Johnson (32)
| Mirza Teletović (7)
| Deron Williams (6)
| Barclays Center17,732
| 40–33
|- style="background:#fcc;"
| 74
| April 2
| @ New York
| 
| Joe Johnson (16)
| Pierce & Plumlee (4)
| Shaun Livingston (3)
| Madison Square Garden19,812
| 40–34
|- style="background:#cfc;"
| 75
| April 4
| Detroit
| 
| Shaun Livingston (23)
| Jason Collins (5)
| Deron Williams (10)
| Barclays Center16,754
| 41–34
|- style="background:#cfc;"
| 76
| April 5
| @ Philadelphia
| 
| Deron Williams (19)
| Mason Plumlee (7)
| Deron Williams (9)
| Wells Fargo Center16,133
| 42–34
|- style="background:#cfc;"
| 77
| April 8
| @ Miami
| 
| Joe Johnson (19)
| Mason Plumlee (8)
| Deron Williams (6)
| American Airlines Arena19,600
| 43–34
|- style="background:#fcc;"
| 78
| April 9
| @ Orlando
| 
| Joe Johnson (31)
| Mirza Teletović (9)
| Kevin Garnett (6)
| Amway Center16,085
| 43–35
|- style="background:#fcc;"
| 79
| April 11
| Atlanta
| 
| Mason Plumlee (17)
| Kevin Garnett (10)
| Gutierrez & Pierce (4)
| Barclays Center17,732
| 43–36
|- style="background:#cfc;"
| 80
| April 13
| Orlando
| 
| Mirza Teletović (20)
| Mason Plumlee (11)
| Deron Williams (5)
| Barclays Center17,732
| 44–36
|- style="background:#fcc;"
| 81
| April 15
| New York
| 
| Marcus Thornton (24)
| Mason Plumlee (9)
| Five players (4)
| Barclays Center17,732
| 44–37
|- style="background:#fcc;"
| 82
| April 16
| @ Cleveland
| 
| Marcus Thornton (20)
| Andray Blatche (12)
| Mason Plumlee (6)
| Quicken Loans Arena19,842
| 44–38

Playoffs

|- style="background:#cfc;"
| 1
| April 19
| @ Toronto
| 
| Johnson & Williams (24)
| Garnett & Johnson (8)
| Johnson & Pierce (4)
| Air Canada Centre19,800
| 1–0
|- style="background:#fcc;"
| 2
| April 22
| @ Toronto
| 
| Joe Johnson (18)
| Pierce & Plumlee (6)
| Livingston & Williams (5)
| Air Canada Centre20,382
| 1–1
|- style="background:#cfc;"
| 3
| April 25
| Toronto
| 
| Joe Johnson (29)
| Shaun Livingston (6)
| Deron Williams (8)
| Barclays Center17,732
| 2–1
|- style="background:#fcc;"
| 4
| April 27
| Toronto
| 
| Paul Pierce (22)
| Andray Blatche (7)
| Deron Williams (6)
| Barclays Center17,732
| 2–2
|- style="background:#fcc;"
| 5
| April 30
| @ Toronto
| 
| Joe Johnson (30)
| Mirza Teletović (7)
| Deron Williams (9)
| Air Canada Centre20,393
| 2–3
|- style="background:#cfc;"
| 6
| May 2
| Toronto
| 
| Deron Williams (23)
| Alan Anderson (9)
| Deron Williams (4)
| Barclays Center17,732
| 3–3
|- style="background:#cfc;"
| 7
| May 4
| @ Toronto
| 
| Joe Johnson (26)
| Kevin Garnett (11)
| Johnson & Williams (4)
| Air Canada Centre20,457
| 4–3

|- style="background:#fcc;"
| 1
| May 6
| @ Miami
| 
| Johnson & Williams (17)
| Paul Pierce (6)
| Livingston & Williams (3)
| American Airlines Arena19,470
| 0–1
|- style="background:#fcc;"
| 2
| May 8
| @ Miami
| 
| Mirza Teletović (20)
| Kevin Garnett (12)
| Deron Williams (6)
| American Airlines Arena19,639
| 0–2
|- style="background:#cfc;"
| 3
| May 10
| Miami
| 
| Joe Johnson (19)
| Andray Blatche (10)
| Deron Williams (11)
| Barclays Center17,732
| 1–2
|- style="background:#fcc;"
| 4
| May 12
| Miami
| 
| Joe Johnson (18)
| Andray Blatche (8)
| Deron Williams (7)
| Barclays Center17,732
| 1–3
|- style="background:#fcc;"
| 5
| May 14
| @ Miami
| 
| Joe Johnson (34)
| Kevin Garnett (8)
| Deron Williams (4)
| American Airlines Arena19,615
| 1–4

Player statistics

Summer League

|-
| style="text-align:left;" | 
| 5
| 1
| 14.1
| .429
| .000
| .900
| 5.2
| 0.0
| 0.20
| 0.40
| 6.6
|- style="background:#f0f0f0;"
| style="text-align:left;" | 
| 4
| 1
| 10.1
| .333
| .000
| .000
| 2.0
| 0.0
| 0.00
| 0.50
| 1.0
|-
| style="text-align:left;" | 
| 1
| 0
| 17.7
| .200
| .000
| .000
| 7.0
| 1.0
| 3.00
| 1.00
| 2.0
|- style="background:#f0f0f0;"
| style="text-align:left;" | 
| 4
| 1
| 24.9
| .462
| .000
| 1.000
| 4.5
| 1.3
| 1.25
| 0.75
| 10.3
|-
| style="text-align:left;" | 
| 2
| 2
| 21.4
| .400
| .333
| .000
| 0.5
| 1.0
| 1.50
| 1.00
| 5.0
|- style="background:#f0f0f0;"
| style="text-align:left;" | 
| 3
| 2
| 26.9
| .375
| .500
| .875
| 2.0
| 2.3
| 0.00
| 0.00
| 7.7
|-
| style="text-align:left;" | 
| 5
| 5
| 29.4
| .458
| .000
| .688
| 7.0
| 2.4
| 0.80
| 0.40
| 13.2
|- style="background:#f0f0f0;"
| style="text-align:left;" | 
| 4
| 2
| 25.9
| .345
| .455
| .000
| 2.8
| 0.3
| 0.75
| 0.75
| 7.5
|-
| style="text-align:left;" | 
| 5
| 5
| 26.4
| .350
| .154
| .571
| 3.8
| 3.2
| 2.40
| 1.00
| 7.6
|- style="background:#f0f0f0;"
| style="text-align:left;" | 
| 2
| 1
| 12.7
| .000
| .000
| .833
| 4.5
| 0.5
| 1.50
| 0.00
| 2.5
|-
| style="text-align:left;" | 
| 4
| 4
| 30.1
| .386
| .100
| .846
| 3.3
| 3.5
| 2.25
| 0.00
| 16.8
|- style="background:#f0f0f0;"
| style="text-align:left;" | 
| 5
| 1
| 24.1
| .462
| .333
| .800
| 2.6
| 3.2
| 0.60
| 0.00
| 13.0
|-
! Totals
! 5
! —
! —
! .403
! .293
! .776
! 33.2
! 15.0
! 9.20
! 3.60
! 76.8
|}

Source: RealGM Basketball

Preseason

|-
| style="text-align:left;" | 
| 7
| 2
| 22.4
| .469
| .444
| .952
| 2.4
| 0.7
| 0.57
| 0.14
| 10.6
|- style="background:#f0f0f0;"
| style="text-align:left;" | 
| 7
| 3
| 22.9
| .500
| .273
| .667
| 4.1
| 1.4
| 0.86
| 1.00
| 12.7
|-
| style="text-align:left;" | 
| 5
| 0
| 12.8
| .364
| .000
| .500
| 3.0
| 0.8
| 0.60
| 0.00
| 1.8
|- style="background:#f0f0f0;"
| style="text-align:left;" | 
| 6
| 6
| 22.3
| .435
| .318
| 1.000
| 2.2
| 2.8
| 0.67
| 0.00
| 9.0
|-
| style="text-align:left;" | 
| 2
| 0
| 22.0
| .625
| 1.000
| .500
| 3.5
| 3.0
| 3.50
| 2.00
| 7.5
|- style="background:#f0f0f0;"
| style="text-align:left;" | 
| 7
| 6
| 20.9
| .613
| .000
| .857
| 3.3
| 4.4
| 1.00
| 0.14
| 7.1
|-
| style="text-align:left;" | 
| 6
| 6
| 20.2
| .579
| .000
| .583
| 3.2
| 0.7
| 0.83
| 2.00
| 13.3
|- style="background:#f0f0f0;"
| style="text-align:left;" | 
| 5
| 5
| 19.8
| .400
| .357
| .750
| 5.2
| 3.6
| 0.60
| 0.40
| 6.8
|-
| style="text-align:left;" | 
| 7
| 1
| 20.1
| .409
| .000
| .593
| 6.1
| 1.1
| 0.86
| 0.86
| 4.9
|- style="background:#f0f0f0;"
| style="text-align:left;" | 
| 7
| 0
| 21.7
| .338
| .304
| .786
| 3.6
| 1.7
| 0.43
| 0.14
| 10.4
|-
| style="text-align:left;" | 
| 1
| 1
| 10.0
| .800
| .750
| .000
| 0.0
| 2.0
| 1.00
| 0.00
| 11.0
|-
! Totals
! 7
! —
! —
! 
! 
! 
! 
! 
! 
! 
! 
|}

Regular season

|-
| style="text-align:left;" | 
| style="background:#FFF; color:#000;" | 78
| style="background:#FFF; color:#000;" | 26
| 22.7
| .400
| .339
| .780
| 2.2
| 1.0
| 0.62
| 0.14
| 7.2
|- style="background:#f0f0f0;"
| style="text-align:left;" | 
| 73
| 7
| 22.2
| .476
| .278
| .742
| 5.3
| 1.5
| 1.03
| 0.52
| 11.2
|-
| style="text-align:left;" | 
| 22
| 1
| 7.8
| .458
| .000
| .750
| 0.9
| 0.2
| 0.36
| 0.05
| 1.1
|- style="background:#f0f0f0;"
| style="text-align:left;" | 
| 30
| 6
| 13.3
| .390
| .000
| .540
| 5.0
| 0.2
| 0.43
| 0.07
| 2.7
|-
| style="text-align:left;" | 
| 54
| 54
| 20.5
| .441
| .000
| .809
| 6.6
| 1.5
| 0.80
| 0.74
| 6.5
|- style="background:#f0f0f0;"
| style="text-align:left;" | 
| 15
| 2
| 16.3
| .463
| .250
| .750
| 1.5
| 2.0
| 0.67
| 0.07
| 4.1
|-
| style="text-align:left;" | 
| 79
| 79
| 32.6
| .454
| .401
| .815
| 3.4
| 2.7
| 0.59
| 0.13
| 15.8
|- style="background:#f0f0f0;"
| style="text-align:left;" | 
| 45
| 4
| 19.0
| .513
| .200
| style="background:#FFF; color:#000;" | .513
| 3.2
| 1.6
| 0.89
| 0.42
| 5.0
|-
| style="text-align:left;" | 
| style="background:#FFF; color:#000;" | 76
| style="background:#FFF; color:#000;" | 54
| 26.0
| .483
| .167
| .827
| 3.2
| 3.2
| style="background:#FFF; color:#000;" | 1.22
| 0.41
| 8.3
|- style="background:#f0f0f0;"
| style="text-align:left;" | 
| 17
| 17
| 31.4
| style="background:#FFF; color:#000;" | .563
| .000
| style="background:#FFF; color:#000;" | .817
| 6.0
| 0.9
| 0.53
| 1.76
| style="background:#FFF; color:#000;" | 20.7
|-
| style="text-align:left;" | 
| style="background:#FFF; color:#000;" | 70
| style="background:#FFF; color:#000;" | 22
| style="background:#FFF; color:#000;" | 18.2
| style="background:#FFF; color:#000;" | .659
| style="background:#FFF; color:#000;" | .000
| style="background:#FFF; color:#000;" | .626
| style="background:#FFF; color:#000;" | 4.4
| style="background:#FFF; color:#000;" | 0.9
| style="background:#FFF; color:#000;" | 0.70
| style="background:#FFF; color:#000;" | 0.79
| style="background:#FFF; color:#000;" | 7.4
|- style="background:#f0f0f0;"
| style="text-align:left;" | 
| 75
| 68
| 28.0
| .451
| .373
| .826
| 4.6
| 2.4
| 1.15
| 0.41
| 13.5
|-
| style="text-align:left;" | 
| 17
| 0
| style="background:#FFF; color:#000;" | 8.1
| style="background:#FFF; color:#000;" | .458
| .000
| .380
| 0.8
| style="background:#FFF; color:#000;" | 0.7
| 0.12
| 0.06
| 1.5
|- style="background:#f0f0f0;"
| style="text-align:left;" | 
| 23
| 3
| style="background:#FFF; color:#000;" | 11.7
| .341
| .250
| style="background:#FFF; color:#000;" | .800
| style="background:#FFF; color:#000;" | 0.7
| style="background:#FFF; color:#000;" | 1.6
| style="background:#FFF; color:#000;" | 0.52
| 0.04
| style="background:#FFF; color:#000;" | 3.9
|-
| style="text-align:left;" | 
| 21
| 1
| 9.6
| style="background:#FFF; color:#000;" | .415
| style="background:#FFF; color:#000;" | .375
| style="background:#FFF; color:#000;" | .789
| style="background:#FFF; color:#000;" | 1.0
| 1.4
| 0.38
| 0.05
| style="background:#FFF; color:#000;" | 3.0
|- style="background:#f0f0f0;"
| style="text-align:left;" | 
| style="background:#FFF; color:#000;" | 72
| style="background:#FFF; color:#000;" | 7
| style="background:#FFF; color:#000;" | 19.4
| style="background:#FFF; color:#000;" | .418
| style="background:#FFF; color:#000;" | .390
| .710
| style="background:#FFF; color:#000;" | 3.7
| style="background:#FFF; color:#000;" | 0.8
| style="background:#FFF; color:#000;" | 0.40
| style="background:#FFF; color:#000;" | 0.32
| style="background:#FFF; color:#000;" | 8.6
|-
| style="text-align:left;" | 
| 35
| 0
| 16.3
| .362
| .379
| .670
| 1.1
| 1.6
| 0.37
| 0.00
| 4.5
|- style="background:#f0f0f0;"
| style="text-align:left;" | 
| 26
| 1
| 23.8
| .414
| style="background:#FFF; color:#000;" | .380
| .800
| 2.8
| 1.2
| 1.04
| 0.12
| 12.3
|-
| style="text-align:left;" | 
| 64
| 58
| 32.2
| .450
| .366
| .801
| 2.6
| 6.1
| 1.45
| 0.20
| 14.3
|-
! Totals
! 82
! —
! —
! .459
! .369
! .753
! 38.1
! 20.9
! 8.60
! 3.79
! 98.5
|}

Sources: Basketball Reference and ESPN

Postseason

First round

|-
| style="text-align:left;" | 
| 7
| 2
| 22.4
| .395
| .294
| .625
| 3.1
| 1.4
| 1.29
| 0.00
| 5.7
|- style="background:#f0f0f0;"
| style="text-align:left;" | 
| 7
| 0
| 15.6
| .471
| .294
| .818
| 5.3
| 0.4
| 0.86
| 0.29
| 7.1
|-
| style="text-align:left;" | 
| 7
| 7
| 20.0
| .564
| .000
| .714
| 5.4
| 1.4
| 0.57
| 0.71
| 8.4
|- style="background:#f0f0f0;"
| style="text-align:left;" | 
| 7
| 7
| 40.9
| .523
| .391
| .824
| 3.6
| 2.7
| 0.57
| 0.29
| 21.9
|-
| style="text-align:left;" | 
| 6
| 0
| 12.0
| .286
| .000
| .750
| 2.0
| 0.8
| 1.33
| 0.33
| 1.2
|- style="background:#f0f0f0;"
| style="text-align:left;" | 
| 7
| 5
| 23.9
| .523
| .000
| .722
| 3.9
| 3.1
| 0.14
| 0.29
| 8.4
|-
| style="text-align:left;" | 
| 7
| 7
| 30.0
| .465
| .333
| .850
| 4.4
| 2.4
| 1.43
| 0.57
| 13.4
|- style="background:#f0f0f0;"
| style="text-align:left;" | 
| 7
| 0
| 12.4
| .455
| .000
| .444
| 2.4
| 0.1
| 0.29
| 0.86
| 2.6
|-
| style="text-align:left;" | 
| 7
| 0
| 18.0
| .408
| .250
| .667
| 3.6
| 0.1
| 0.43
| 0.14
| 7.4
|- style="background:#f0f0f0;"
| style="text-align:left;" | 
| 6
| 0
| 12.2
| .345
| .286
| .714
| 1.8
| 0.2
| 0.33
| 0.00
| 5.7
|-
| style="text-align:left;" | 
| 7
| 7
| 36.3
| .419
| .294
| .780
| 2.1
| 5.6
| 1.43
| 0.14
| 16.9
|-
! Totals
! 7
! —
! —
! .461
! .303
! .743
! 37.1
! 18.3
! 8.43
! 3.57
! 97.7
|}

Source: Basketball Reference

Conference semifinals

|-
| style="text-align:left;" | 
| 5
| 0
| 20.7
| .417
| .286
| .700
| 2.0
| 1.0
| 0.2
| 0.0
| 6.2
|- style="background:#f0f0f0;"
| style="text-align:left;" | 
| 5
| 0
| 12.6
| .417
| .000
| .875
| 4.6
| 0.2
| 0.0
| 0.0
| 5.4
|-
| style="text-align:left;" | 
| 5
| 5
| 21.9
| .458
| .000
| 1.000
| 7.6
| 1.2
| 1.0
| 0.0
| 4.8
|- style="background:#f0f0f0;"
| style="text-align:left;" | 
| 2
| 0
| 1.7
| .000
| .000
| .500
| 0.5
| 0.0
| 0.0
| 0.0
| 1.0
|-
| style="text-align:left;" | 
| 5
| 5
| 36.7
| .548
| .433
| .889
| 4.2
| 3.2
| 0.4
| 0.2
| 20.2
|- style="background:#f0f0f0;"
| style="text-align:left;" | 
| 4
| 0
| 18.2
| .625
| .000
| .615
| 2.8
| 1.3
| 0.5
| 0.3
| 4.5
|-
| style="text-align:left;" | 
| 5
| 5
| 31.7
| .500
| 1.000
| .737
| 3.0
| 3.6
| 0.8
| 0.6
| 11.4
|- style="background:#f0f0f0;"
| style="text-align:left;" | 
| 5
| 5
| 31.7
| .466
| .400
| .667
| 4.6
| 1.4
| 0.8
| 0.0
| 14.0
|-
| style="text-align:left;" | 
| 3
| 0
| 9.2
| .400
| .000
| .000
| 2.0
| 0.3
| 0.3
| 0.3
| 1.3
|- style="background:#f0f0f0;"
| style="text-align:left;" | 
| 5
| 0
| 18.8
| .485
| .458
| .667
| 3.0
| 0.4
| 0.4
| 0.2
| 9.4
|-
| style="text-align:left;" | 
| 4
| 0
| 12.8
| .440
| .143
| .500
| 1.7
| 2.0
| 0.0
| 0.3
| 6.3
|- style="background:#f0f0f0;"
| style="text-align:left;" | 
| 5
| 5
| 34.9
| .367
| .421
| 1.000
| 4.6
| 6.2
| 0.6
| 0.2
| 11.2
|-
! Totals
! 5
! —
! —
! .465
! .393
! .725
! 38.8
! 18.4
! 4.8
! 1.8
! 92.4
|}

Source: Basketball Reference

Overall

|-
| style="text-align:left;" | 
| 12
| 2
| 21.8
| .403
| .290
| .667
| 2.7
| 1.3
| 0.83
| 0.00
| 5.9
|- style="background:#f0f0f0;"
| style="text-align:left;" | 
| 12
| 0
| 14.3
| .448
| .000
| .833
| 5.0
| 0.3
| 0.50
| 0.17
| 6.4
|-
| style="text-align:left;" | 
| 12
| 12
| 20.8
| .524
| .000
| .739
| 6.3
| 1.3
| 0.75
| 0.42
| 6.9
|- style="background:#f0f0f0;"
| style="text-align:left;" | 
| 2
| 0
| 1.5
| .000
| .000
| .500
| 0.5
| 0.0
| 0.00
| 0.00
| 1.0
|-
| style="text-align:left;" | 
| 12
| 12
| 39.1
| .533
| .415
| .837
| 3.8
| 2.9
| 0.50
| 0.25
| 21.2
|- style="background:#f0f0f0;"
| style="text-align:left;" | 
| 10
| 0
| 14.4
| .467
| .000
| .647
| 2.3
| 1.0
| 1.00
| 0.30
| 2.5
|-
| style="text-align:left;" | 
| 12
| 10
| 27.1
| .512
| 1.000
| .730
| 3.5
| 3.3
| 0.42
| 0.42
| 9.7
|- style="background:#f0f0f0;"
| style="text-align:left;" | 
| 12
| 12
| 30.7
| .465
| .358
| .781
| 4.5
| 2.0
| 1.17
| 0.33
| 13.7
|-
| style="text-align:left;" | 
| 10
| 0
| 11.4
| .438
| .000
| .444
| 2.3
| 0.2
| 0.30
| 0.70
| 2.2
|- style="background:#f0f0f0;"
| style="text-align:left;" | 
| 12
| 0
| 18.3
| .439
| .339
| .667
| 3.3
| 0.3
| 0.42
| 0.17
| 8.3
|-
| style="text-align:left;" | 
| 10
| 0
| 12.4
| .389
| .238
| .667
| 1.9
| 0.3
| 0.20
| 0.10
| 5.9
|- style="background:#f0f0f0;"
| style="text-align:left;" | 
| 12
| 12
| 35.7
| .395
| .340
| .800
| 3.2
| 5.8
| 1.08
| 0.17
| 14.5
|-
! Totals
! 12
! —
! —
! .463
! .342
! .737
! 37.8
! 18.3
! 6.92
! 2.83
! 95.5
|}

Sources: Basketball Reference and ESPN

Injuries

Roster

Transactions

Trades

Free agents

Re-signed

Subtractions

Awards

Notes

See also

 2013–14 NBA season
 2014 NBA playoffs

References

External links

 2013–14 Brooklyn Nets preseason at ESPN
 2013–14 Brooklyn Nets regular season at ESPN
 2013–14 Brooklyn Nets postseason at ESPN

Brooklyn Nets season
Brooklyn Nets seasons
Brooklyn Nets
Brooklyn Nets
2010s in Brooklyn
Events in Brooklyn, New York
Prospect Heights, Brooklyn